Wendy Liebman (born February 27, 1961 in Manhasset, New York) is an American stand-up comedian. Her standup style involves the use of gently paced, subtle wordplay.

Early life
Liebman grew up in Roslyn, Long Island, New York. Her earliest performances involved her, her sister, and a neighborhood friend performing the play Rumpelstilskin in their basement.

In 1983, Liebman graduated from Wellesley College with a bachelor's degree in psychology.  After graduating from college, Liebman did a stint as a psychology researcher at Harvard Medical School Massachusetts Mental Health Center.

Career
In 1984, after taking a class at the Cambridge Center for Adult Education, Liebman began performing stand-up comedy in the Boston area.

In 1996, Liebman won the American Comedy Award for Female Stand-up Comedian of the Year.

Liebman has appeared on The Tonight Show with Johnny Carson, The Larry Sanders Show on HBO, Dr. Katz - Professional Therapist, Jimmy Kimmel Live!, Late Show with David Letterman, Late Night with Jimmy Fallon and The Late Late Show with Craig Ferguson.

In November 2011, her Showtime special, Wendy Liebman: Taller On TV debuted. In May 2012, it was posted on her website as a $5 DRM-free download, then in 2014 it was released as an audio download.

Liebman is the daughter-in-law of the late Robert B. Sherman.

In 2014, Liebman and her husband were driving when they were struck by a drunk driver. The accident resulted in damage to seven cars and one fatality. The incident affected Liebman's standup career, and so the following year, to “get back out there in a big way” Liebman decided to be a contestant on season nine of America's Got Talent. On August 13, 2014, she was eliminated in the quarter-finals, but on August 15, 2014, judge Howard Stern picked Liebman as his wild card for the season, bringing her to the semi-finals. She was eliminated once more on the September 3 episode.

Personal life
Liebman is Jewish. Although she did not grow up with a strong Jewish identity, she developed a greater connection to her Judaism after reading The Complete Idiot's Guide to Jewish History and Culture.

On April 12, 2003, Liebman married TV producer and writer Jeffrey Sherman, whose father and uncle (the Sherman Brothers) wrote film music for Walt Disney in the 1960s.  Sherman has two sons from a previous marriage.

In December 2015 Liebman moved from her rented home in Studio City into a house in the West Hills neighborhood of Los Angeles.

Discography

Album
 Taller on TV (2014) (Image Entertainment)

Filmography

Shorts
 The Remote (2000) directed by Frank Chindamo
 50 Greatest (2011) (spoof of VH1 countdown shows)

Stand-up Specials
Writer, Performer
 Girls' Night Out 1994
 Women of the Night IV 1995
 Comic Relief VII 1995
 HBO Comedy Half-Hour 1996
 Stand-Up Spotlight 2002
 Green Collar Comedy Show 2010
 Wendy Liebman: Taller on TV 2011 (also director)

References

External links 

1961 births
American stand-up comedians
Living people
American television actresses
American film actresses
People from Roslyn, New York
Wellesley College alumni
American women comedians
Jewish American female comedians
America's Got Talent contestants
People from Manhasset, New York
People from Studio City, Los Angeles
People from West Hills, Los Angeles
20th-century American comedians
21st-century American comedians
Comedians from California
20th-century American actresses
21st-century American actresses
21st-century American Jews